The Richmond Trophy was an international figure skating competition for ladies' singles held annually from 1949 to 1980 at the Richmond Ice Rink in Twickenham, London. It was the only invitational international competition (as opposed to the ISU Championships) held on a regular basis in the post-war years. The competition was sponsored by the National Skating Association and was largely due to the activity of Arnold Gerschwiler, coach of many champions at the Richmond rink.

At the last event in November 1980, participation was down to only eleven competitors, attributed to scheduling conflicts with the growing number of other international competitions such as Skate Canada International. Moreover, the National Skating Association had two years previously started another international competition, the St. Ivel International, also held at the Richmond rink but earlier in the fall and including competition in all four disciplines of skating, which by 1980 was already established as one of the more prestigious competitions on the international circuit.  Therefore, the ladies-only Richmond Trophy event was discontinued.

Medalists

References

Figure skating competitions
Figure skating in the United Kingdom